Ceriana ornata  is an Australian species of hoverfly in the family Syrphidae. Resembling a wasp, this hoverfly preys on other insects including Australian native bees and the planthopper. 
Bottom image shown is a Potter wasp, Ancistrocerus Kereri (Dalla Torre 1904) and resembles Ceriana Ornata. C. Ornata can be identified by its distinct Y shaped antenna, large compound eyes and only has two wings.

References

Eristalinae
Insects of Australia
Insects described in 1845